The Franklin River, a perennial river of the West Gippsland catchment, is located in the South Gippsland region of the Australian state of Victoria.

Location and features
The river descends  over its combined  course.

There are many good fishing spots with good public access.

See also

List of rivers in Australia

References

West Gippsland catchment
Rivers of Gippsland (region)